Red Voodoo is the eleventh studio album by American musician Sammy Hagar, and his first album to feature his band the Waboritas. This album was released on March 23, 1999 by MCA Records. When Hagar finished touring in support of his Marching to Mars album, he recorded this album. Red Voodoo is an extension of the party atmosphere that permeated Hagar's concerts on that tour and the album contains a party-vibe. "Mas Tequila" was the lead single and alluded to Hagar's other career endeavor, as his Cabo Wabo tequila was being distributed throughout the United States.

Song information
 "Don't Fight It (Feel It)" was performed live by another of Hagar's bands, Los Tres Gusanos, before it was released on Red Voodoo.

Track listing

Personnel
 Sammy Hagar: lead vocals and guitar
 Victor Johnson: guitar
 Jesse Harms: keyboards
 Mona Gnader: bass guitar
 David Lauser: drums

Additional personnel
 Roy Rogers: "Bad ass Slide guitar on 'Don't Fight It (Feel It)'"
 Tower of Power: horns on "'Don't Fight It (Feel It)"

Live In Cabo

Red Voodoo was sold with a bonus disc at Best Buy retail stores. The mini-CD was recorded at the band's first performance together by the SFX Radio Network. The performance was from the Cabo Wabo Cantina in Los Cabos, Mexico, on May 17, 1997.

 "Red" (John Carter/Sammy Hagar) – 4:52
 "Heavy Metal" (Sammy Hagar/Jim Peterik) – 4:25
 "Right Now" (Michael Anthony/Sammy Hagar/Alex Van Halen/Edward Van Halen) – 4:39

Singles
 "Mas Tequila" b/w "Little White Lie"  US (MCA TRKS7 55574)
 "Mas Tequila (Radio Edit)" b/w "Little White Lie (Album Version)"  US (MCA TRK5P 4304)
 "Mas Tequila (Radio Edit)" b/w "Shag"  Europe (MCA 155 582-2)
 "Mas Tequila" b/w "Shag (Miami mix)" b/w "The Revival (Miami mix)"  US (MCA)
 "Shag (Version One)" b/w "Shag (Version Two)" US (MCA TRK5P-4367)
 "Right On Right (Radio Edit)" US (MCA TRK5P-4407) TRK5P-4367

Versions
MCA Records (US) : TRKD 118727
MCA Records (Japan) : MVCE 24135 (includes the "Right Now" track from the Live in Cabo disc.)
MCA Records (Taiwan) : TRKD 11872

External links
 Lyrics from Hagar's official web site

References

Sammy Hagar albums
1999 albums
MCA Records albums